Bloomingrose is an unincorporated community in Boone County, West Virginia, United States. Bloomingrose has a post office with ZIP code 25024.

The community was named for the flowers near the original town site.

References

Unincorporated communities in Boone County, West Virginia
Unincorporated communities in West Virginia